Mafioso is a 1962 Italian Mafia black comedy film directed by Alberto Lattuada. The film stars Alberto Sordi as a factory manager who visits his hometown in Sicily and is tasked with performing a hit for the Mafia. It was awarded Best Film at the San Sebastian Film Festival.

Plot
Antonio Badalamenti, a Sicilian who has been settled for many years in Northern Italy and is employed in a car factory in Milan, takes a vacation with his family, leaving behind the modern conveniences of his home in northern Italy, to visit his childhood village in Sicily and introduce his blond, northern-Italian wife, Marta, to his mother, father and other relatives back home.

While his wife suffers in the comparatively rustic conditions of her husband's hometown and has trouble adapting to the culture of Sicily, Antonio becomes reacquainted with his childhood friends. He also pays a visit to the local don, Don Vincenzo, who is a crime boss. The don smooths over some problems Antonio had with a deal to buy some property on the island, and in return, Antonio is tasked with carrying out a hit for the mob. As an outsider with no strings attached and a crack shot, Antonio is seen as a perfect candidate.

While his wife is sleeping one night, Antonio leaves for what is purportedly a hunting trip with his friends. In reality, he is put inside a wooden crate and smuggled aboard an airplane into the United States, where he goes to New York City to carry out his task. The job done, he is returned to Sicily in the same manner and arrives back at home as if from the hunting trip. Plagued by what he has done, he goes back to his efficient job at the car factory.

Cast
 Alberto Sordi as Antonio Badalamenti
 Norma Bengell as Marta
 Gabriella Conti as Rosalia
 Ugo Attanasio as Don Vincenzo
 Cinzia Bruno as Donatella
 Katiusca Piretti as Patrizia
 Armando Tine as Dr. Zanchi
 Lilly Bistrattin as Dr. Zanchi's Secretary
 Michèle Bailly as Young Baroness
 Francesco Lo Briglio as Don Calogero
 Carmelo Oliviero as Don Liborio

Home media
It was released in the US by The Criterion Collection, but as of March 31, 2013, the title is out of print.

References

External links
 
 
 
 
 Mafioso: The Octopus’s Tentacles an essay by Roberto Chiesi at the Criterion Collection

1962 films
1960s black comedy films
Italian crime comedy films
Mafia comedy films
Italian black-and-white films
Films about the Sicilian Mafia
Films set in Sicily
Films set in Milan
Films set in New York City
1960s Italian-language films
Films scored by Nino Rota
Commedia all'italiana
Films directed by Alberto Lattuada
Films with screenplays by Age & Scarpelli
Films produced by Dino De Laurentiis
Films with screenplays by Rafael Azcona
1962 comedy films
1962 drama films
1960s American films
1960s Italian films